Epiphany, Inc. (previous NASDAQ symbol: EPNY), previously known as E.piphany and Epiphany Marketing Software, was a company that developed customer relationship management (CRM) software. On September 29, 2005, Epiphany was acquired by SSA Global Technologies. Epiphany CRM software is now produced by Infor, which acquired SSA Global in 2006.

Employees included:
 founders Steve Blank, Ben Wegbreit, Greg Walsh, and John P. McCaskey; 
 chairman Roger Siboni; 
 CEO Karen Richardson.
 Craig Weissman, who led the database schema team at Epiphany, went on to become chief architect and CTO at Salesforce.
 Scott Hansma, who led development for EpiCenter Manager and related pluralization technologies, went on to several high-level engineering roles at Salesforce, including Chief Architect
 Sridhar Ramaswamy, in charge of customer data and relationships, eventually became VP of Ads at Google.
 Ben Treynor and Boris Debic, who managed operations at Epiphany, continued to do so at Google in the roles of SRE Tzar and chief history officer respectively. 
 Mehran Sahami, one of the authors of the machine learning stack at Epiphany was also one of the creators of the ML technology which was in the foundation of the ads business at Google. 
 Jon Miller, Phil Fernandez, and David Morandi founded Marketo.
 Jon Miller and Brian Babcock founded Engagio.
 Andrew Bunner, lead defendant in DVD Copy Control Ass'n, Inc. v. Bunner.
 George John, founder and CEO of Rocket Fuel Inc.

Sahami (Stanford) and Boris Debic (ZSEM and Luxembourg School of Business) went on to teach artificial intelligence.

Steve Blank teaches entrepreneurship at Stanford and Columbia.

References

Software companies based in California
Customer relationship management software companies
Companies based in Palo Alto, California
Defunct software companies of the United States

simple:Epiphany (software)